Clementino Ocampos (November 14, 1913, in San Lorenzo, Paraguay – January 4, 2001) was a Paraguayan composer and poet. His parents were Justiniano Ocampos and Telesfora Melgarejo.

Early life

In 1932, Ocampos was enlisted in compulsary military service, fighting in the battle of Paraguayan Chaco and remaining in military service from then until 1935.

Ocampos was an accomplished and popular poet in his time as much as he is today. He wrote works in the native Paraguayan Guaraní language, using vivid narrative and exciting imagery that is widely beloved by the more established soloists and groups of his homeland.

Clementino Ocampos, "popular poet," has earned a privileged place in the native musical work, having left a legacy of his extraordinary work compositions that continue to delight lovers of authentic folk music sung in a cadence and perfect Guaraní to this day.

Career

Bilingual poet (Spanish-Guaraní). As a poet, dominated bilingualism and speaking perfect Spanish and Guaraní which is reflected in many of his works, with the most native words used in them. Thanks to his knowledge was possible recruitment as a translator of Spanish Guaraní for the information services of the United States Embassy, in performing that task in space of eighteen and a half years.

As a bilingual poet, one of his memorable work was to translate fully Guaraní preferred that the speech John F. Kennedy, on the occasion of the inauguration of the office of President of the USA, whose text was published subsequently completed by the Embassy of that country in Paraguay.

Clementino Ocampos was also golf player and author of short stories and legends in Guaraní, was one of the great entertainers of the nights of music, singing and poetry of the curve Restaurant, where he spent unforgettable moments with the presence of notable artistic and enshrined numbers that performed their actions with the production of this unforgettable peasant who knew both delight and amuse their fellow citizens with the occurrences of outbreaks with his rich imaginations.

Distinctions

The year 1997 was decorated as Illustrious Citizen of his hometown, San Lorenzo, a fitting tribute for a person who has left an example of consecrated life to the difficult task of artistic labor.

Works

Clementino Ocampos has left a legacy to their homeland and all those who feel the taste of popular songs like "Kuña Guapa" with music by Francisco F. Larrosa.

 “Seis de Enero”,
 “Paloma Saite”,
 “Martinita Aurelia”,
 “Rubita Mimaguive”,
 ”Kamba kue mi”,
 “Presente Feliz”,
 “Poranguereko”,
 “Mi alteñita”,
 “Oimembapa che ru”, are a remarkable beauty. The composers Bernardo Avalos, Pablo Barrios, Aristóbulo Aguilera, Paulino Gonzalez, Adolfo Peña, Martin Escalante, Rodolfo Roa and Santiago Cortesi, among others, who were made music his poems.

He has collected and published his works in a single volume entitled Pyhare memby [Son of the night].

Among his works are described below:

“Kuña Guapa”
Gallo kuéra osapukái ko´eti oñemboja

Epu ´a eñakakarai kuña guapa tahecha

Toku ´e kena tumby to juasake tetyma

Típica tojeroky ta iñesperansa kosina

II

Kaay ta hetyma ta hyjui ha tahaku

Henda huele café ra aje´ima to pupo

Tokaruke ryguasu to mbo´a ta hyguata

Y pyahu to jereru kambuchi to revosa

III

Toimba tembi´u ra tata ári ta haku

Henda guepe ao ky´a heta por ata ijaruru

Moroti va camisa taipoti ta hyakuavu

Ani anga hesa´yju ovyvy harupi opyta

IV

Sabana kotypegua taipoti tapiaite

portiju la dosegua ta heve kada ko´e

koty ´ipe ke toiko torypápe  la karu

pukavype te reiko to reindi  che mborayhu

V

Kane ´o la dosegua araire tohopa

Osorova umi che ao poraite e remenda

Nde deber ka ´arugua pohaita ku tererépe

Te reho che rendaipe ha upei ta merenda

VI

Oguahévo ka ´aru te reho eñempolva

To jajai umi nde resa ha pyyinte che retu

Kuña guapa  nde rekope virumi reipuru kuaava

Ha ko´eramo tupaópe ñamenda mba´e hagua.

The song "Seis de Enero" composed by the tailor Clementino Ocampos in 1945 is the story of what he has suffered his own but which today has become a social outcry. This testimony tells that on January 5, 1945, was eager to deliver a suit, in order to buy valuable gift for the day of kings, his little daughter barely 3 years old, named Ramona Berlarmina. Until the end the client was not presented to withdraw his request, and as a result there was no pay and no money to acquire the long-awaited gift.

On the next day by failing to find the expected gift of kings, the girl felt so sad and exclaimed: - Why are the Kings bad, and brought me nothing!, Which has caused so much impression his father and finally finished translating their feelings in this poem written in jopara (mixed Spanish and Guaraní), which finally Martin Escalante has rhythm and has been very popular in Paraguay.

And now more than ever, this time in which we live, this music becomes more current.

Here it is. Lyric Clementino Ocampos and music Martin Escalante.

6 DE ENERO 
Era hermosa la mañana, era el Día de Los Reyes,

las sonrisas infantiles mundopyre iñasãi, (1)

cada cual con el obsequio que el Mago les hiciera

por ser bueno y obediente, vy’águi osapukái. (2)

Más un niño que era pobre, también bueno y obediente,

al no serle obsequiado isymíme oporandu: (3)

Por qué mamá querida Los Reyes del Oriente

no me hizo un regalito, ha entérope ogueru. (4)

Yo mamita soy más bueno que Antonio y Andresito,

y de muchos amiguitos añembo´ekuaaiteve; (5)

qué malos son Los Reyes no me trajo ni un autito

comprámena mamita, aipotánteko che ave. (6)

Así se queja el pobre sin cariño y sin halago

que su padre fue un tirano ni ndohechávai chupe (7)

y esa terrible orfandad no tiene sus Reyes Magos

que le haga un regalito el 6 de enero yave. (8)

Translation
(1) mundopyre iñasãi: It is spread through the world

(2) vy'águi osapukái: He shouts of joy

(3) isymíme oporandu: He asked his mommy

(4) ha entérope ogueru: And they all brought

(5) añembo'ekuaaiteve: I pray even better

(6) comprámena mamita, aipotánteko che ave: Please mommy, I would also like to have something

(7) ni ndohechávai chupe: Not even saw him

(8) yave: During

Bibliography

 Sonidos de mi Tierra.
 Biblioteca Virtual

External links
Paraguay Profundo

1913 births
2001 deaths
Paraguayan composers
Male composers
20th-century Paraguayan poets
Paraguayan male poets
People from San Lorenzo, Paraguay
Guarani-language writers
20th-century male writers
20th-century male musicians